Zovashen, Ararat may refer to:

Zovashen (Dzhannatlu), Ararat, Armenia
Zovashen (Keshishveran), Ararat, Armenia